The Mount Carmel Precinct is the largest (in both area and population) of the eight precincts of Wabash County, Illinois. Roughly 85% of Wabash County's population resides in the precinct. Mount Carmel, Illinois, the county seat, is also the seat of the precinct.

Adjacent precincts and townships
Wabash County
 Bellmont Precinct
 Coffee Precinct
 Friendsville Precinct
 Lick Prairie Precinct
 Wabash Precinct
Gibson County, Indiana
 Montgomery Township
 Wabash Township
 White River Township
Knox County, Indiana
 Decker Township

 (38.414859, -87.768596)

References 

Precincts in Wabash County, Illinois